Dry is a 2022 Italian apocalyptic comedy film directed by Paolo Virzì, from a screenplay by Paolo Giordano. The film features an ensemble cast which includes Silvio Orlando, Valerio Mastandrea, Sara Serraiocco and Monica Bellucci.

The film had its world premiere at the 79th Venice International Film Festival on 8 September 2022 and was first theatrically released in Italy on 29 September 2022.

Synopsis
In a dystopian present, it hasn't rained in Rome for three years and a series of characters must cope with the drought that has reduced water reserves to a minimum and with an epidemic of sleeping sickness carried by cockroaches.

Cast

Production
Principal photography began on 17 February 2021, in Rome, Italy. The film entered post-production in May 2021.

Release
The film premiered at the 79th Venice International Film Festival on 8 September 2022. Its first theatrical release was in Italy on 29 September 2022.

Reception
Dry grossed $0 in North America and a worldwide total of $1.8 million.

See also 
 List of Italian films of 2022

References

External links
 
 

Italian comedy films
2022 films
Films directed by Paolo Virzì
Films set in Rome
2020s Italian films
2020s Italian-language films
Apocalyptic films